Damer is a surname. Notable people with the surname include:

Anne Seymour Damer, née Conway, (1748–1828), English sculptor
Damer Leslie Allen, Irish-born early twentieth-century aviator
George Damer, 2nd Earl of Dorchester PC, PC (Ire) (1746–1808), British politician, styled Viscount Milton between 1792 and 1798
George Dawson-Damer (1788–1856), British Conservative Party politician
Henry Dawson-Damer, 3rd Earl of Portarlington KP (1822–1889), Irish peer
Joseph Damer, 1st Earl of Dorchester (1718–1798), wealthy landowner associated with reshaping Milton Abbey and creating the village of Milton Abbas in Dorset, England
Lady Christian Norah Dawson-Damer (1890–1959), the sister-in-law of Queen Elizabeth the Queen Mother
Lionel Dawson-Damer, 4th Earl of Portarlington (1832–1892), British peer and Conservative politician
T. Edward Damer, philosopher and author
the Damer Islands (Kepulauan Damer), previously spelt "Damar Islands", in Maluku province of Indonesia
Damer Hall, a former school and former theatre in Dublin, Ireland
Damer House, a Georgian house on the grounds of Roscrea Castle in County Tipperary, Ireland
Dawson-Damer family, a powerful and wealthy multigenerational Anglo-Irish family

See also
Mine damer og herrer, 2010 studio album by Danish singer Kim Larsen
Dahmer (disambiguation)